Arcanjo Renegado (English: Dissident Archangel) is a Brazilian television series that was released on Globoplay on 7 February 2020. It stars Marcelo Mello Jr., Álamo Facó, Flávio Bauraqui, Erika Januza, Leonardo Brício, Rita Guedes, and Bruno Padilha.

On 18 February 2020, the series was renewed for a second season to premiere in 2021.

Premise 
According to the angelic hierarchy, Mikhael (Marcello Melo Jr.) is the prince of the archangels. His name, invoked to represent courage, strong defense and divine protection, resounds like a battle cry. Mikhael is the name of the first sergeant of the Special Police Operations Battalion (BOPE). Mikhael is the only soldier who leads a team in BOPE and is considered the best trained, effective and lethal of the battalion, respected within the corporation and feared by bandits. When one of his friends is injured in an operation, he seeks revenge and ends up in conflict with the main political leaders of the state.

Cast

Main 
 Marcello Melo Jr. as Mikhael Afonso
 Álamo Facó as Ronaldo Leitão
 Flávio Bauraqui as Barata
 Erika Januza as Sarah
 Leonardo Brício as Coronel Gabriel
 Rita Guedes as Manuela Berengher
 Bruno Padilha as Custódio Marques
 Ademir Emboava as Augusto Savassi
 Alex Nader as Sargento Rafael
 Rogério Casanova as José Nogueira "Chucky"

Recurring 
 Luciana Bezerra as Jurema
 Renato Régis as Wagner
 Roosevelt Luiz as Galvão
 Robson Galvão as Ivan
 Ivan Blaz as Major Pedro
 Sérgio Dantas as Jocas
 Danni Suzuki as Capitã Luciana Mayumi
 Guti Fraga as Luís Eustáquio
 Léa Garcia as Dona Laura
 Tatsu Carvalho as Antônio Faustini

Awards and nominations

References

External links 
 

2020s Brazilian television series
2020 Brazilian television series debuts
Portuguese-language television shows
Globoplay original programming
Brazilian drama television series
Brazilian crime television series
Television shows set in Rio de Janeiro (city)
Works about organized crime in Brazil